The A37 motorway is a motorway in the Netherlands. It is approximately 42 kilometers in length. The A37 is located entirely in the Dutch province of Drenthe.

The A37 connects the city of Hoogeveen with Emmen and the German border (Twist, Germany) near Zwartemeer. At the border, the road continues as the German road B402, which connects to the German A31 a few kilometers east of the border.

Along the entire length of the motorway, the European route E233 follows the A37.

History 
Until 2003, the main connection between Hoogeveen and the German B402 road was the two-laned N37 highway. In that year, construction of the motorway finished on the section between interchanges Hoogeveen and Holsloot and that part of the road, now upgraded from 'N37' to 'A37', was opened to traffic. Since October 2007, the remaining stretch between Holsloot and the German border has also been upgraded from highway N37 to motorway A37.

Exit list

External links

Motorways in the Netherlands
Motorways in Drenthe